James Dearth (born January 22, 1976) is a former American football long snapper. Dearth, who attended Tarleton State University, was selected by the Cleveland Browns in the sixth round of the 1999 NFL Draft.

He has also been a member of the New York Jets, Washington Redskins, San Diego Chargers and New England Patriots.

Early years
Dearth attended Scurry-Rosser High School in Scurry, Texas and was a student and a letterman in football. In football, he was a starter at both, quarterback and middle linebacker, and was an All-State honoree at both positions.

Professional career

Cleveland Browns
Dearth was selected by the Cleveland Browns in the sixth round (191st overall) of the 1999 NFL Draft.

New York Jets
In 2001, the Jets would sign the free agent Dearth as a tight end/long snapper. In that same year he recorded a career-high three receptions and a touchdown. Following the season, Dearth was relegated to long snapping duties and was a consistent part of the Jets' special teams unit until he became a free agent and was replaced by Tanner Purdum following the 2009 season.

Washington Redskins
On August 14, 2010, Dearth would sign with the Washington Redskins. Dearth was expected to compete with the "inconsistent" Nick Sundberg. Despite Sundberg's inconsistencies he slowly progressed throughout training camp and eventually Dearth was waived on August 31, 2010 in favor of the improved Sundberg.

San Diego Chargers
The San Diego Chargers signed Dearth on September 15, 2010 after a hamstring injury saw long snapper David Binn placed on injured reserve. Two days later on September 17, 2010, Dearth suffered a foot injury during practice and would subsequently be placed on injured reserve before playing a game for the Chargers.

New England Patriots
Dearth signed with the New England Patriots on August 29, 2011. He was released on September 4.

Personal
Dearth is married to his wife, Laurie, with whom he has three children, Kaitlyn, Kendall, and Kolton. Dearth, a devout Christian, is known to be a "low-key and cordial" person. 

Dearth co-owns an Athletic Republic franchise in the Houston area with friend and former Jets running back Derrick Blaylock. The facility opened in December 2009 aiming to help young athletes prepare for professional careers.

References

External links 
 San Diego Chargers bio

1976 births
Living people
People from Kaufman County, Texas
American football long snappers
American football tight ends
Cleveland Browns players
New York Jets players
Washington Redskins players
San Diego Chargers players
Tarleton State Texans football players
New England Patriots players
People from Fort Ord, California